Sheila Raheja Institute of Hotel Management (SRIHM), Bandra is a hospitality educational institute in Mumbai, Maharashtra, India. The college is an initiative of K Raheja Group and offers graduate programs in hospitality and culinary. The courses are affiliated to the University of Mumbai

Campus
The college is located at Bandra, Mumbai. SRIHM has infrastructure spread over 40,000 square feet and has a virtual hotel within its premises, which includes classrooms, basic training kitchens, quantity training kitchen, advanced training kitchens, bakery, confectionery, garde manger/cold kitchen,
training restaurants & cocktail bars, front office lab, housekeeping labs, gymnasium, library, computer lab, auditorium, and locker rooms.

Governing Council

The Governing Body combines staff experienced in hospitality, retail and education.
 Mr. Shyam Wadhwani, President
 Mr. Sandeep G. Raheja, Vice President
 Mr. Mr. R.N. Zurale, General Secretary
 Mr. K.D. Abhichandani, Member
 Dr. R.A. Heredia, Member
 Prin. B.P. Sahni, Member Secretary

References

External links 

Universities and colleges in Mumbai
2014 establishments in Maharashtra
Hospitality schools in India